Mohamed Al-Amin Mohamed Al-Hadi (also spelled Muhammad al Amin Muhammad al Hadi) was born in Brava or Barawa on 23 May 1967. He is a member of the Somali Parliament and Director and founder of Alshahid Centre for Research and Media Studies.

References 

Alumni of Middlesex University
Alumni of SOAS University of London
Living people
Alliance for the Re-liberation of Somalia politicians
Members of the Transitional Federal Parliament
Year of birth missing (living people)